Al Nairyah is one of the governorates in Eastern Province, Saudi Arabia.

References 

Populated places in Eastern Province, Saudi Arabia
Governorates of Saudi Arabia